Alfonso de la Cueva-Benavides y Mendoza-Carrillo, marqués de Bedmar (first name also spelled Alonso, often used was the title Bedmar) (25 July 157410 August 1655) was a Spanish diplomat,  bishop and Roman Catholic cardinal. He was born in Bedmar, in what is now the province of Jaén. Alfonso was the son of Luis de la Cueva-Benavides, 2nd señor of Bedmar, and Elvira Carrillo de Mendoza y Cárdenas.

Early years
Alfonso was born at Bedmar, now Bedmar y Garciez,  province of Jaen, Spain.  At an early age, he pursued a military career at the side of his father, who was the captain general of the Canary Islands. After 1590, he took his father's place in his absence, and a year later was named captain of the Harquebusiers. After the death of his father in 1599, he became the 3rd lord  of his house and became a commander of a Cavalry company.

On 23 December 1606 King Philip III of Spain made him the Spanish ambassador to the Republic of Venice. This was an important position due to the amount of information concerning European affairs which passed through the hands of the Spanish representative. On 16 April 1610 King Philip III awarded him the title of Knight of the Order of Alcántara. In 1614, aged around 42, he was made Marqués de Bedmar, which he would resign when promoted to the cardinalate.

In 1618 King Philip III charged him with the devolution of the territories conquered by the Spanish forces in Piedmont to the duke of Savoy. In 1616 Venice concluded an alliance with France, Switzerland, and the Netherlands to counter Spain's power. Bedmar was instructed to destroy this league and, with  Pedro Téllez-Girón, 3rd Duke of Osuna, viceroy of Naples (1574–1624),  and the Spanish Governor of the Duchy of Milan,  Gómez Suárez de Figueroa, 3rd Duke of Feria,  planned a naval invasion to bring the city closer to the Spanish sphere of influence. The scheme was to be carried out on Ascension Day in 1618 but was revealed by the French, and Bedmar, protected by his position from arrest, left Venice.

After the fiasco of Venice, Bedmar went to Flanders as president of the council. In 1622 he received the red hat of a cardinal. Later, he became the ambassador extraordinary and counselor of Governor of the Habsburg Netherlands, Infanta Isabella Clara Eugenia and the Junta of War in Flanders.

The authorship of an anonymous work, Squitinio della libertà Veneta, published at Mirandola in 1612, has been attributed to him.

Cardinalate and episcopate 

Created Cardinal Deacon in the consistory of 5 September 1622 under Pope Gregory XV, (9 January or 15 January 1554Pope 6 February 16218 July 1623), born Alessandro Ludovisi, de la Cueva, then around 51, did not participate in the Consistory  of 1623 electing new Pope  Urban VIII. He became a Cardinal Priest, receiving the title of San Martino ai Monti on 18 July 1633. De la Cueva opted for the title of Santa Balbina on 9 July 1635 and participated in the papal conclave of 1644.

De la Cueva opted however for the order of bishops and the suburbicarian see of Palestrina, on 17 October 1644. He was consecrated on 23 October 1644. Named bishop of Málaga, retaining the diocese of Palestrina on 27 July 1648, he did not take possession of the diocese until 1651. He did not participate in the papal conclave of 1655.

He died in Málaga and was buried in the Cathedral of Málaga.

Notes 
  sources vary, some indicating 2 August, Oviedo
  sources vary, some indicate 1607
  some sources indicate that new research proves there was no conspiracy and Bedmar was framed by Spain political opponents
  Dictionnaire des cardinaux and some other sources indicate he became bishop of Oviedo but other sources call this an error

References

Attribution:

External links 

 The Cardinals of the Holy Roman Church
https://web.archive.org/web/20100322131623/http://cismamagina.es/pdf/14-06.pdf
http://www.cismamagina.es/pdf/22-05.pdf
https://web.archive.org/web/20090831062552/http://www.isel.org/cuadernos_2004/articulos/troyano_jm.htm
https://web.archive.org/web/20100326105937/http://www.tercios.org/personajes/inf_espanola_3.html
http://www.grandesp.org.uk/historia/gzas/montijo.htm
https://web.archive.org/web/20100210033103/http://www.tercios.org/personajes/ARTILLERIA_flandes.html
http://www.abcgenealogia.com/Carrillo00.html

1574 births
1655 deaths
17th-century Spanish cardinals
Cardinal-bishops of Palestrina
Cardinal-bishops of Sabina
Cueva, Alonso de la
Ambassadors of Spain to the Republic of Venice
Ambassadors of Spain to the Netherlands